Wang Jiaxiang (born September 1936) is a Chinese translator of Black American literature and female literature. She was a professor at Beijing Foreign Studies University.

Biography
Wang was born in Wuxi, Jiangsu, in September 1936. Due to the Second Sino-Japanese War, she was raised in southwest China's Sichuan, Guizhou and Guangxi provinces. In the summer of 1947, her family moved to Nanjing, where she secondary studied at Mingde Girls' High School. In 1948, her family relocated to Shanghai, she entered Xuhui Girls' High School in the following year. On July 1, 1949, her family moved to Beijing and she studied at Beiman Girls' High School. In 1953, Wang studied, then taught, at what is now Beijing Foreign Studies University. In 1982 she earned her Master of Arts in English literature from Griffith University. She studied at Cornell University as a Ruth scholar in 1986 and studied at the W. E. B. Du Bois Institute of Harvard University in 1998.

Work

Translations
 Uncle Tom's Cabin
 A Dog of Flanders
 The Sense of Wonder
 Three Days To See
 Jacob's Room
 Speak, Memory
 Walden

Papers
 A Preliminary Study of the Works of Tony Morrison, a Black Female Writer  (1988)
 On Alice Walker's Novel Art  (1988)
 In the Shadow of Richard Wright: Two African-American Female Writers in the 1930s and 1940s: Zola Neil Hurston and Ann Patry  (1989)

Awards
 2014  Colored People: A Memoir  won the 6th Lu Xun Literature Prize for Translation
 2016 Chinese Translation Association - "Senior Translator"

References

1936 births
Living people
Writers from Wuxi
Beijing Foreign Studies University alumni
English–Chinese translators
Academic staff of Beijing Foreign Studies University
Educators from Wuxi
People's Republic of China translators